Watches and Wonders (formerly Salon International de la Haute Horlogerie, SIHH) is a trade show of the international watch and jewelry industry. It is organized by the Fondation de la Haute Horlogerie (FHH) and takes place at Palexpo in Geneva, Switzerland. 
Mainly attended by Richemont group brands, the SIHH is considered as one of the major shows for luxury watches along with Baselworld.

Watches and Wonders was scheduled for 25-29 April 2020 but was canceled due to the COVID-19 pandemic, and converted to an online format.

History
Established in 1991, the SIHH was a deliberate attempt by Cartier, along with Baume & Mercier, Piaget, Gérald Genta and Daniel Roth, to create a more exclusive trade show dedicated to fine watchmaking.
SIHH 2019, which was held from January 14 - 17, 2019, attracted over 23,000 visitors and journalists. In 2018, Audemars Piguet and Richard Mille announced that they will no longer attend SIHH starting in 2020. In October 2019, FHH announced that for its 30th edition (2020), SIHH would change its name to Watches and Wonders Geneva, and would be held in successive weeks with Baselworld until 2024. In April 2020  Rolex, Patek Philippe, Chopard, Chanel and Tudor announced that they would be pulling out of Baselworld and host their own fair in April 2021.

See also
Baselworld
Hong Kong Watch & Clock Fair

References

External links

Trade fairs in Switzerland
Horological organizations
1991 establishments in Switzerland
Recurring events established in 1991
Annual events in Switzerland